Violet is a 1981 American short film directed by Shelley Levinson and starring Didi Conn. It won the Oscar for Best Live Action Short Film in 1982. The film is based on the Doris Betts short story, "The Ugliest Pilgrim," first published in the collection Beasts of the Southern Wild and Other Stories in 1973 (Harper & Row Publishers).

Cast
Didi Conn as Violet
Patrick Dollaghan as Monty
Rodney Saulsberry as Flick
Tom McGowan as Dr. Pleasance
Belle Richter as Mrs. Higgins
Doris Hess as Effie

References

External links

1981 films
1981 short films
American short films
American independent films
Live Action Short Film Academy Award winners
1981 independent films
Films based on short fiction
1980s English-language films
1980s American films